Shruthi Chandrasena, known professionally as Hariprriya, is an Indian actress and model who chiefly works in Kannada films, in addition to a few Tamil and Telugu films. Hariprriya married Kannada actor Vasishta N. Simha on 26th January 2023

Early life
Hariprriya was born on 29 October 1991 in Chikkaballapur, India. After completing her schooling, she received training in the dance form of Bharatanatyam. Later, her family moved to Bangalore, where she completed pre-university courses. In 2013, her mother urged Shruthi to alter spelling from Hariprriya to Harriprriya for numerological reasons, however, she declined the reports, citing "My mother insisted that I change my spelling."

Career

Early work (2007–2014)
Hariprriya used to participate in a number of cultural programmes. When she was studying in 12th class, director Richard Castelino saw stills of her from the programmes and offered her the female lead role in the Tulu film Badi. She then made her Kannada film debut in Manasugula Mathu Madhura (2008), following which she was part of Vasanthakala. Her performance in the political satire Kallara Santhe (2009) opposite Yash earned her a Filmfare nomination for Best Kannada actress, while her next film Cheluveye Ninne Nodalu which starred Shiva Rajkukar received a number of positive reviews, making Hariprriya popular in Karnataka. In 2010, she also forayed into the Tamil and Telugu film industries with Kanagavel Kaaka, and Bhumika Chawla's maiden production, Thakita Thakita, opposite Harshvardhan Rane respectively, with the latter emerging a moderate success. After that, Hariprriya shifted her focus to Tamil and Telugu projects, working on Cheran's Muran in Tamil and Pilla Zamindar in Telugu which had Nani in a male lead role, was a big superhit movie. She was also part of the political drama Mukhyamantri I Love You, produced in 2008, which has not been released.
She debuted in Malayalam with Thiruvambadi Thamban." In her third Telugu film Abbayi Class Ammayi Mass, she played a call girl, which required a two-week long immersion workshop to get into character.

Ugram success and breakthrough (2014–2016)
In 2014, she returned to Kannada cinema with the gangster film Ugramm. Shraddhaa of The New Indian Express wrote that it was "a strong performance by Hariprriya, who is natural in her act". The film went on to become a major commercial success and she was said to have made a "sensational comeback to Kannada films". Sify wrote that Ugramm "did wonders to Hariprriya" as she subsequently offered more Kannada projects. After the success of Ugram, she gained popularity in the Kannada film industry and she became one of the most wanted heroines in the industry. She became part of the big banner films, Ranna and Ricky as well as the comedy film Bullet Basya. She started 2015 with Ranna where she was paired with Indian actor Sudeep for the first time. The movie went on to become hit at the box office.

Her second release in the year is Bullet Basya where she was paired opposite Sharan and received a positive response for her role as Kaveri in the film. In 2016, her first release was Ricky opposite Rakshit Shetty where she played as Radha a Naxalite, for which she had reduced her weight by half. The critics wrote that "The performance of Hariprriya in the film was appreciated." Her next release in the year was Ranatantra where she was paired opposite Vijay Raghavendra. She was also seen in a special appearance in a song in Bhale Jodi. Her next release in the year was in hit movie, Neer Dose where she played the character Kumudha a bar dancer. The critics wrote that "Hariprriya has essayed a powerful role in her career. Her performance in the movie is phenomenal". The movie turned out to be a turning point in her film career.

Established actress (2017–present)
After the success of  Neer Dose movie, she became one of the prominent actresses of the Kannada film industry. In 2017, she played Haasini's role, a North Karnataka girl in Bharjari, film. After Ranna, she and Rachita Ram were seen together onscreen for the second time. The New Indian Express described "Hariprriya has a good role in the movie. Her character is the main turning point for the story." She also appeared in a cameo appearance in Anjaniputra film.

In 2018, she returned to Telugu cinema with Jai Simha film playing a mechanic's role in Manga character. The movie became a blockbuster hit. Her next release was a Kannada film Kanaka. Her next release along with Chiranjeevi Sarja was Samhara, in which she essayed a negative character. The New Indian Express wrote that "Hariprriya's performance as a negative character is phenomenal. She got a chance to prove her versatility of acting in the movie." Her next release for the year was Life Jothe Ondh Selfie. The Times of India wrote "Hariprriya has played the modern girl Rashmi who has lots of pains from her past. She has essayed the character very well."

Her first release of 2019 was Bell Bottom that became the biggest blockbuster film of 2019. The writers of The New Indian Express wrote "Hariprriya's character as the innocent but intelligent love interest is well placed". Publication writers of described  "Hariprriya delivers yet another solid act, showing why she is considered as one of the most versatile actresses around right now". The Deccan Chronicle wrote "It is Hariprriya, who yet again finds a perfect character and is at her charming best playing Kusuma." Her next release of 2019 was Soojidara directed by Mounish Badiger. Her next film was D/O Parvathamma. Her 25th Kannada film was Naganna's Kurukshetra, starring Sumalatha Ambareesh, Suraj Gowda and Prabhu Mundukar as the lead roles.

Her next in  2019 is film with Tejaswi's movie Ellide Illi Tanaka. The Chitraloka described "it is Hariprriya who steals the show with yet another sensible character. It makes the audience fall in love with her portrayal of Nandini's character on screen." Her next release of 2019 was Mayura Raghavendra's film Kannad Gothilla, starring Sudharani and other actors. During the same year, she acted in Katha Sangama directed by Rishab Shetty.

Hariprriya's first and only release of 2020 is Hari Santosh's historical novel-based movie Bicchugatti: Chapter 1 − Dalvayi Dange.

After a gap of a year her first release in 2022 was Vijay Prasad's comedy drama film Petromax where she was paired opposite Satish Ninasam. The film met with negative reviews upon release from both audience and critics and was a commercial failure at the box office. Her next release was her Tamil comeback film Naan Mirugamai Maarawhere she was paired opposite Sasikumar where she played the role of a housewife named Anandi. The film met with negative reviews from both audience and critics and it was a box-office bomb

Upcoming projects
As of November 2022, Hariprriya has seven releases such as Vijay Kiran's Happy Ending that features Gurunandhan, Amruthamathi, K.Madesh's Lagaam that features Upendra, Evaru remake with Diganth, Jayathertha's Bell Bottom 2 with Rishab Shetty, Shashank's untitled film with Upendra, Baragur Ramachandrappa's Thaayi Kasthoor Gandhi and

Controversies
In 2019, Kannada film Soojidara's director Mounesh Badiger accused Hariprriya for defaming his film. He later lodged a complaint with the Karnataka Film Chamber of Commerce, accusing her of portraying the film in a negative way.

Filmography

Awards and nominations

References

External links
 
 

1991 births
Living people
20th-century Indian actresses
Actresses from Karnataka
Actresses in Kannada cinema
Actresses in Malayalam cinema
Actresses in Tamil cinema
Actresses in Telugu cinema
Actresses in Tulu cinema
Indian film actresses
People from Chikkaballapur district